Dersu Uzala (alternative U.S. title: Dersu Uzala: The Hunter) is a 1975 Soviet-Japanese film directed and co-written by Akira Kurosawa, his only non-Japanese-language film and his only 70mm film.

The film is based on the 1923 memoir Dersu Uzala (which was named after the native trapper) by Russian explorer Vladimir Arsenyev, about his exploration of the Sikhote-Alin region of the Russian Far East over the course of multiple expeditions in the early 20th century. Shot almost entirely outdoors in the Russian Far East wilderness, the film explores the theme of a native of the forests who is fully integrated into his environment, leading a style of life that will inevitably be destroyed by the advance of civilization. It is also about the growth of respect and deep friendship between two men of profoundly different backgrounds, and about the difficulty of coping with the loss of capability that comes with old age.

The film won the Academy Award for Best Foreign Language Film, the Golden Prize and the Prix FIPRESCI at the 9th Moscow International Film Festival, and other awards. It was also a box office hit, selling more than  tickets in the Soviet Union and Europe in addition to grossing  in the United States and Canada.

Plot
In 1910, in a forest that is being cleared for development, a man of some social standing is searching for an unmarked grave of a friend he says had been buried three years prior. He cannot find any trace of it amid the tumult of rampant construction.

The film then flashes back to a topographic surveying expedition to the area of Shkotovo in Ussuri region in 1902 led by the same man, Captain Arsenyev (Yury Solomin). Early in its journey the troop encounters a nomadic Goldi hunter named Dersu Uzala (Maxim Munzuk).  Arsenyev is immediately taken with the man's capabilities as a woodsman, and asks him to become their guide through the harsh frontier. Without a word he takes the lead on the trail the next morning.

Viewed even by the roughhewn cossack soldiers as an uneducated, eccentric old man, Dersu earns everyone's respect through his great experience, accurate instincts, keen powers of observation, and deep compassion. He repairs an abandoned hut and leaves essential provisions of rice, salt, and matches wrapped in birch bark so that a future traveler without them may survive in the wilderness. He deduces the identities and circumstances of complete strangers as he goes by analysing tracks and articles left behind.

Captain Arsenyev reduces his party to just four men, sending the rest ahead to a rendezvous point.  Late one day he and Dersu go alone to explore the vast and featureless Lake Khanka.  As dusk approaches they become lost in the frozen expanse when wind squalls erase their tracks back to camp.  With the last rays of light they are overtaken by a sudden blizzard. Dersu directs Arsenyev to quickly cut and gather reeds - as many as fast as he can, as their lives, he warns, depend on it.  Arsenyev complies, with a will, but soon begins to stumble from exhaustion.  Repeatedly he is compelled back into action by Dersu.  Finally he collapses, out cold.  Disoriented in the sun and calm of the next morning, he pieces together that Dersu had built a shelter out of the reeds, dragged him into it, and saved his life.  He is forever indebted to his new friend.

The party then continues onward, ravaged in time by fatigue and starvation, barely able to drag its sled. Facing its last, it is halted by Dersu, who sniffs out a Nani family's home by the scent of frying fish. The men are renewed by food, warmth, and hospitality offered by the simple peasants.  With the end of the expedition near, Dersu asks Arsenyev where he will go next. "Back to Khabarovsk," he replies, and invites Dersu to come with him.  Dersu tells him that his place is in the forest and that tomorrow he will go on his way.  Offered pay for his services, he declines, asking only for some cartridges for his rifle to hunt with.  When the party reaches the railroad tracks the next day - which Dersu had only ever heard of before - he takes his leave and returns to the wilderness.

Five years pass.  In 1907 Arsenyev begins another expedition in Ussuri. He labors mapping mountain ranges for months, all the while holding hope that he will run into his dear friend. One night at camp one of his men says he ran into an old hunter on the trail a bit back who was asking about their unit. Arsenyev rushes anxiously in the man's direction.  Hailing an approaching figure, he is overcome with joy when Dersu answers his call.  That evening the two sit by a fire and catch each other up.  Arsenyev asks Dersu to serve as guide again, and is accepted.

Some time on Arsenyev divides his party, sending some upstream at river to search for a ford while he and a handful of men attempt to cross on a log raft.  In the chaos of unloading, Arsenyev and Dersu get marooned on the raft and are quickly rushed downstream towards dangerous rapids. Seeing again that Arsenyev does not know how to save his own life, Dersu pushes him off and tells him to swim toward shore. Without even a pole to steer with Dursu makes a desperation leap for the stump of a tree branch midriver a mere moment before the raft is destroyed in a cataract.  He then directs the party to cut a tree which can reach him before his strength ebbs in the torrent.  One after another they point to a trunk, unable to size up either that tree's height or buoyancy, only to have Dersu shout it down. Finally one is acceptable, downed ferociously, and girded at its base with a lash of every belt and harness in the group.  As its thinnest uppermost branches sweep by Dersu he seizes them and is pulled to shore.

Some time passes, with everyone in good spirits. Pictures are taken with Dersu, variously posing formally, pretending to be in action, and caught casually. Arsenyev writes in his journal that some of his fondest memories of Dersu occurred during the beginning of that autumn.

A short time later, the troop is trekking through the forest when Dersu realises they are being stalked by an amu, a huge and dangerous Siberian tiger considered sacred to the native peoples. As he had in an encounter with one during the first expedition, Dersu tries to run the animal off by telling it the forest is big enough for both of them, and that it should go its own way. The tiger instead continues to close on Dersu and Arsenyev until Dersu is forced to shoot at it (but misses). Dersu is instantly distraught over doing so. Despite Asenyey's encouragement that the tiger is not injured, Dersu is convinced it will run until dead. He states that Kangnga, the forest deity that his people worship, will be unhappy and will send another amu for him. Shortly after Arsenyev spots a buck, which Dersu fails to even make out.  Directed where to point his rifle by Arsenyev, his shot misses.  Dersu realizes he can no longer provide for himself as a hunter.  Dogged now by twin fears he becomes irritable, yelling at members of the party and distancing himself from Arsenyev.

Ultimately, Dersu appeals to Captain Arsenyev to take him home with him. The nomad quickly discovers how ill-suited he is to living in a "box", prohibited from even shooting his rifle to clean its barrel or put up a tent to sleep outdoors, in a place where people pay for water and he gets arrested for trying to chop down a tree in the city park for firewood for the home.  Despite his love for Arsenyev and his family, Dersu tells his "captain" he must return to living in the hills. As a parting gift, Arsenyev gives him the newest edition military rifle.

Some while later, Arsenyev receives a telegram informing him that the body of a Goldi has been found, with no identification on him save Arsenyev's calling card. Arsenyev is requested to come identify it.  Arriving by train, he recognizes the corpse as Dersu's without even having to lift the tarp. The official in charge asks some routine questions.  When Arsenyev answers that the man was a friend, and a hunter, the official says that no rifle was found with him - then speculates that he must have been killed to get it.  As the gravediggers finish their work, a heartsick Arsenyev finds Dersu's walking stick nearby and plants it in the ground beside the grave.

Cast
Yury Solomin as Vladimir Arsenyev
Maxim Munzuk as Dersu Uzala
Vladimir Kremena as Turtygin
Alexander Pyatkov as Olenev
Svetlana Danilchenko as Anna
Suimenkul Chokmorov as Chzhan Bao

Production
In an interview conducted for the 1999 RUSCICO DVD release, co-star Solomin stated that Kurosawa had long known of Arsenyev's book and had planned to make a film version very early in his career in the late 1930s, but had dropped the project after realising that it had to be made in the taiga region where the events had actually taken place. The Soviet government allowed few foreigners there.  By the 1970s they allowed Kurosawa and his team, but monitored them closely during the year-long production.

In 1971, Kurosawa attempted suicide during a difficult period in his career, questioning his creative ability after the commercial failure of Dodes'ka-den the year before and the subsequent denial of funds for his productions by Japanese studios. In 1972, Dodes'ka-den producer Yoichi Matsue and his assistant Teruyo Nogami were approached by the Soviet studio Mosfilm for an adaptation of the Russian memoir Dersu Uzala to be directed by Kurosawa. On 1 January 1973, Matsue signed the deal on the condition that Kurosawa receive full creative control. Mosfilm wanted Kurosawa's frequent collaborator Toshiro Mifune to play Dersu, but Matsue convinced them otherwise as Mifune would not be attached to such a long production. Eventually, Tuvan actor Maxim Munzuk was cast. Mosfilm, like Japan's Toho studio that Kurosawa usually worked with, found it impossible to keep the perfectionist director to a tight budget and schedule.

Box office
Dersu Uzala sold  tickets in the Soviet Union, and made  in the United States and Canada. It also sold 994,988 tickets in France, 32,400 tickets in Sweden, and 48,265 tickets in other EU territories since 1996, adding up to  tickets sold in the Soviet Union and Europe.

See also
 Dersu Uzala—1961 Soviet film directed by Agasi Babayan
 Dersu Uzala (historic person)
 Dersu Uzala (book, 1923)
 List of submissions to the 48th Academy Awards for Best Foreign Language Film
 List of Soviet submissions for the Academy Award for Best Foreign Language Film

References

External links

Dersu Uzala Info
Stills from Dersu Uzala with Russian text
 
Dersu Uzala an essay by Donald Richie at the Criterion Collection

1975 films
1970s adventure drama films
1970s biographical drama films
Soviet biographical drama films
Russian biographical drama films
Soviet adventure drama films
1970s Russian-language films
Russian adventure drama films
Films directed by Akira Kurosawa
Daiei Film films
Mosfilm films
Best Foreign Language Film Academy Award winners
Films set in Khabarovsk Krai
Films set in Primorsky Krai
1975 in the Soviet Union
Japan–Soviet Union relations
Films with screenplays by Akira Kurosawa
Films based on works by Yuri Nagibin
Japanese multilingual films
Soviet multilingual films
Survival films
Films about hunters
1975 drama films
Films set in 1902
Films set in 1907
Films set in 1908
Films set in 1910
Films set in the Russian Empire
1975 multilingual films
Japanese adventure drama films
Japanese biographical drama films
1970s Japanese films